The 1999–2000 Asian Club Championship was the 19th edition of the annual international club football competition held in the AFC region (Asia). It determined that year's club champion of association football in Asia.

Al-Hilal of Saudi Arabia won the final and became Asian champions for the second time, beating Júbilo Iwata 3–2 in the final.

First round

West Asia

|}
1 Al-Qadisiya withdrew.

East Asia

|}
1 Dalian Wanda withdrew. 
2 Happy Valley withdrew. 
3 Valencia had been drawn against the champions of Nepal, but the Nepalese FA did not send a team.

Second round

West Asia

|}

East Asia

|}
1 The match was played over one leg by mutual agreement. 
2 The first leg was cancelled due to the condition of the pitch at Valencia's home ground.

Quarter-finals

West Asia

East Asia

Semi-finals

Third place match

Final

References

Asian Club Competitions 2000 at RSSSF.com

2000 in Asian football
1999 in Asian football
1999-2000